The 1998 UEFA European Under-21 Championship qualification began in 1996. The final tournament was held in 1998 in Romania.

The 46 national teams were divided into nine groups (eight groups of 5 + one group of 6). The records of the nine group winners were compared, and the eighth and ninth ranked teams played-off against each other for the eight quarter finals spot.  One of the eight quarter-finalist were then chosen to host the remaining fixtures.

Qualifying Groups

Draw
The allocation of teams into qualifying groups was based on that of 1998 FIFA World Cup qualification with several changes, reflecting the absence of some nations:
 Groups 1, 2, 4, 5 and 7 featured the same nations
 Group 3 did not include Azerbaijan, but included France (who did not participate in World Cup qualification)
 Group 6 did not include Faroe Islands
 Group 8 did not include Liechtenstein
 Group 9 did not include Northern Ireland

Group 1

 qualify as group winners

Group 2

 qualify as group winners

Group 3

 qualify as group winners

Group 4

 qualify as group winners

Group 5

 qualify as group winners

Group 6

 qualify as group winners

Group 7

 qualify as group winners

Group 8

 qualify as group winners

Group 9

 qualify as group winners

Ranking of group winners

List of qualifying group winners. Teams 1–7 qualify automatically.  Teams 8 & 9 play-off for the eighth spot. Only results between top four teams in group are used.

Qualifying play-off 

4–4 on aggregate, Greece won on away goals rule.

See also
1998 UEFA European Under-21 Championship

 
qualification
Qualification
UEFA European Under-21 Championship qualification